Halysidota pectenella is a moth of the family Erebidae. It was described by Watson in 1980. It is found in Mexico, Guatemala, El Salvador, Costa Rica, Colombia, Venezuela, French Guiana, Ecuador, Peru, Bolivia and possibly Brazil.

References

Halysidota
Moths described in 1980